Jesper Horsted (born February 27, 1997) is an American football tight end for the Las Vegas Raiders of the National Football League (NFL). He played college football at Princeton.

College career
Horsted played wide receiver for the Princeton Tigers for four seasons. As a junior, he set school records with 92 receptions and 14 receiving touchdowns with 1,226 yards and was named first-team All-Ivy League. He caught 72 passes for 1,047 yards with 13 touchdowns in his senior season and was again named first-team All-Ivy. He finished his collegiate career as the schools all-time leader with 196 receptions and 28 receiving touchdowns and second with 2,703 receiving yards.

Horsted also was a member of the Princeton baseball team. He hit .324 with seven doubles and 14 RBIs in 36 games as a junior and batted .312 in 104 games over three seasons.

Professional career

Chicago Bears
Horsted signed with the Chicago Bears as an undrafted free agent on May 13, 2019. He was cut at the end of training camp, but was re-signed to the Bears' practice squad on September 1, 2019. Horsted was promoted to the Bears active roster on November 20. He made his NFL debut on November 24 against the New York Giants, catching one pass for four yards. Four days later against the Detroit Lions, he was named starting tight end as injuries plagued his teammates. In the third quarter, he scored his first NFL touchdown on an 18-yard reception from quarterback Mitchell Trubisky; the score tied the game at 17 apiece, and the Bears went on to win 24–20. Horsted finished his rookie season with eight receptions for 87 yards and a touchdown in six games played.

Horsted was among the final roster cuts on September 5, 2020, and was placed on the practice squad a day later. On January 11, 2021, Horsted signed a reserve/futures contract with the Bears, and spent season on the Bears' practice squad.

On August 28, 2021, Horsted caught three touchdown passes in the Bears' preseason finale against the Tennessee Titans. Horsted secured a spot on the Bears 53-man roster for the 2021 season. On October 10th, 2021, Horsted caught a 2-yard touchdown against the  Las Vegas Raiders from Justin Fields, marking Fields’ first career passing touchdown in the NFL.

On May 11, 2022, Horsted was waived following a failed physical.

Las Vegas Raiders
Horsted signed with the Las Vegas Raiders as a free agent on June 7, 2022.

References

External links
Princeton Tigers bio
Las Vegas Raiders bio

1997 births
Living people
American football tight ends
Las Vegas Raiders players
People from Shoreview, Minnesota
Players of American football from Minnesota
Princeton Tigers baseball players
Princeton Tigers football players
Sportspeople from the Minneapolis–Saint Paul metropolitan area
Roseville Area High School alumni